A Pool Element (PE) is a server in the Reliable server pooling (RSerPool) framework.

The responsibilities for a PE are the following:
 Answer keep-alive messages from its Pool Registrar,
 Deregister from a handlespace at a Pool Registrar upon end of service,
 Provide the actual application service.
 Register into a handlespace at a Pool Registrar,

Standards Documents 
 Aggregate Server Access Protocol (ASAP)
 Aggregate Server Access Protocol (ASAP) and Endpoint Handlespace Redundancy Protocol (ENRP) Parameters
 Endpoint Handlespace Redundancy Protocol (ENRP)
 Reliable Server Pooling Policies

External links 
 IETF RSerPool Working Group
 Thomas Dreibholz's Reliable Server Pooling (RSerPool) Page

Internet protocols
Internet Standards